Robin Froidevaux (born 17 October 1998) is a Swiss road and track cyclist, who currently rides for UCI ProTeam .

Major results

Gravel

2022
 1st Serenissima Gravel

Road

2015
 3rd Time trial, National Junior Championships
2016
 2nd E3 Harelbeke Juniors
 9th Road race, UEC European Junior Championships
2018
 2nd Road race, National Under-23 Championships
2019
 1st Stage 2 (TTT) Tour de l'Avenir
 8th Road race, UEC European Under-23 Championships
 8th Road race, European Games
 10th Overall Tour du Jura
2020
 2nd  Team relay, UEC European Championships
 3rd Time trial, National Under-23 Championships
 6th Overall Orlen Nations Grand Prix
2021
 5th Overall Tour d'Eure-et-Loir
2022
 National Championships
1st  Road race
4th Time trial
 Istrian Spring Trophy
1st  Points classification
1st Stage 3
 9th La Roue Tourangelle

Track

2015
 2nd  Team pursuit, UCI World Junior Championships
2016
 1st  Omnium, National Junior Championships
2017
 2nd Madison, National Championships
 3rd Team pursuit, UCI World Cup, Milton
2018
 2nd  Team pursuit, UEC European Under-23 Championships
 2nd Omnium, National Championships
2019
 European Games
1st  Madison (with Tristan Marguet)
3rd  Team pursuit
 UCI World Cup
1st Team pursuit, Cambridge
3rd Team pursuit, Brisbane
 National Championships
1st  Omnium
1st  Madison (with Théry Schir)
 UEC European Under-23 Championships
3rd  Madison (with Mauro Schmid)
3rd  Team pursuit
2020
 National Championships
1st  Sprint
1st  Madison (with Théry Schir)
2021
 1st  Madison (with Théry Schir), National Championships

References

External links

1998 births
Living people
People from Morges
Swiss male cyclists
Swiss track cyclists
Cyclists at the 2019 European Games
European Games medalists in cycling
European Games gold medalists for Switzerland
European Games bronze medalists for Switzerland
Olympic cyclists of Switzerland
Cyclists at the 2020 Summer Olympics
Sportspeople from the canton of Vaud